The Wallis Professorship of Mathematics is a chair in the Mathematical Institute of the University of Oxford. It was established in 1969 in honour of John Wallis, who was Savilian Professor of Geometry at Oxford from 1649 to 1703.

List of Wallis Professors of Mathematics
 1969 to 1985: John Kingman
 1985 to 1997: Simon Donaldson
 1999 to 2022: Terence Lyons
 2022 to date: Massimiliano Gubinelli

See also
 List of professorships at the University of Oxford

References

Mathematics education in the United Kingdom
Professorships at the University of Oxford
St Anne's College, Oxford
Professorships in mathematics
1969 establishments in England